The 1956–57 Scottish Second Division was won by Clyde who, along with second placed Third Lanark, were promoted to the First Division. East Stirlingshire finished bottom.

Table

References 

 Scottish Football Archive

Scottish Division Two seasons
2
Scot